Ricardo Alós Bailach (born 11 October 1931), sometimes known as just Ricardo, is a Spanish former professional footballer who played as a forward. A prolific goalscorer, he is best known for winning the 1957–58 Pichichi Trophy in a three-way tie.

Club career
Alós began his senior career in 1952 with the reserves of his local side, Valencia Mestalla. In the 1956-57 season, he moved to Sporting Gijón in the Segunda División and scored 46 goals in the season winning the Pichichi Segunda División, and setting the all-time record for goals scored in a season in that division.

His strong season with Sporting Gijón earned him a move to the senior Valencia side in La Liga, and in his debut season he scored 19 goals; he earned the Pichichi Trophy that season, in a three-way tie with Alfredo Di Stéfano and Manuel Badenes.

After Valencia, he moved to Real Murcia in 1960 in the Segunda División where he played inconsistently, although they won the 1962–63 Segunda División. He played his final year with Ontinyent, retiring in 1964.

International career
Alós played one match for the Spain B national team in 1958, in the 1953–58 Mediterranean Cup.

Honours
Valencia Mestalla
Segunda División: 1956–57

Real Murcia
Segunda División: 1962–63

Individual
Pichichi Segunda División: 1956–1957
Pichichi Trophy: 1957–58

References

External links
 

1931 births
Living people
People from Horta Nord
Sportspeople from the Province of Valencia
Spanish footballers
Spain B international footballers
Association football forwards
Valencia CF Mestalla footballers
Sporting de Gijón players
Valencia CF players
Real Murcia players
Ontinyent CF players
La Liga players
Segunda División players
Pichichi Trophy winners